Thomas Gatch may refer to:-

Thomas Benton Gatch (1841–1933), officer in the U.S. confederate army in the American Civil War
Thomas Milton Gatch (1833–1913), president of Willamette University, Oregon State University, and the University of Washington
Thomas Leigh Gatch (1891–1954), his grandson, American naval officer and attorney